Minna Maaria Sirnö (born 14 May 1966 in Tampere) is a Finnish politician and member of Finnish Parliament, representing the Left Alliance. She was elected to Finnish Parliament in 2003. She lost her seat in 2011 elections.

External links
Parliament of Finland: Minna Sirnö 
Home page 

1966 births
Living people
Politicians from Tampere
Finnish trade unionists
Left Alliance (Finland) politicians
Members of the Parliament of Finland (2003–07)
Members of the Parliament of Finland (2007–11)